is a magical girl tokusatsu comedy series created by Shotaro Ishinomori, and the 11th installment of the Toei Fushigi Comedy Series. The series ran from January 7, 1990 to December 30, 1990 for a total of 51 episodes.

Synopsis
It's the first day of the new school year and the Murakami kids, Yuko, Momoko and Takuto, are excited to be heading back and catch up with their friends. While Takuto makes it to school, Yuko stops by a shrine that doesn’t get too many visitors these days to pray for the new school year. At the shrine Yuko accidentally breaks the bell and drops it on top of a kami's head. Because she is the only person that stopped by the shrine in a long time, he grants her the power to become a superheroine, based on another ancient deity. It is her job to protect her neighborhood from the threats it faces. With the transformation phrase  she transforms into the Masked Belle Poitrine. Later she gets an ally in Poitrine Petite, in reality her little sister Momoko.

Characters

Portrayed by 
The heroine of the series. Cheerful and optimistic, with a strong sense of justice. The eldest daughter of the Murakami household, with two younger brother and sister. She's a high school sophomore. She transforms into Poitrine to fight the monsters that infest her neighborhood. If her identity is revealed she will turn into a frog.

Portrayed by 
Yuko's sister, and the youngest of the siblings. After the invasion of the Dark Emperor Diable, Kami-sama gave Momoko a supporting role to Poitrine as Poitrine Petite. Though Poitrine Petite fights alongside Poitrine, they have a rivalry. She and Yuko do not know each other's identity which is subject to punishment if they were to find out.

Portrayed by 
Yuko's brother. Longs to embrace Poitrine. Becomes a leader by creating a "Poitrine club" with friends Kazuya, Shinsuke and Kenji.

Portrayed by 
The Murakami family's father.

Portrayed by 
The Murakami family's mother.

Portrayed by 
A police detective working for the Tokyo Metropolitan Police Department Nishihonmachi station who wishes to arrest Poitrine. She is Kazuya's mother.

Portrayed by 
The son of Ritsuko Honda and one of Takuto's friends who is very skinny, and is skilled at various sports. 

Portrayed by 
One of Takuto's friends who is chubby. He makes up new weapons for the Poitrine Club. His mother works as a pharmacist.

Portrayed by 
One of Takuto's friends who wears large round glasses who is the smartest in the Poitrine Club. His parents own a tonkatsu shop.

Portrayed by 
The deity for the neighborhood shrine. He has been the guardian of Yuko's town for a while, but he has also had a sinus infection. He needs to remedy with a trip to the hot springs in Italy. He gives Yuko the ability to transform, who visited the shrine by chance.

Portrayed by 
The dark emperor. Plots to control Japan and conquer the universe. Diable is French for devil.

Episodes

Staff
 Creator: Shotaro Ishinomori
 Planning: Yoshiaki Kobayashi (Toei), Kyotaro Kimura (Yomiuri Koukokusha), Kenichiro Haraoka & Takashi Ishihara (Fuji TV)
 Producer: Jun Hikasa, Masayuki Nishimura, Shigenori Takatera (Toei)
 Story editor:  Yoshio Urasawa 
 Script: Yoshio Urasawa, Naoki Iwahara
 Directors: Takaharu Saeki, Shinji Murayama, Taro Sakamoto, Kaneharu Mitsumura, Naoki Iwahara
 Coach: Takaharu Saeki, Shinji Murayama, Taro Sakamoto, Kaneharu Mitsumura, Iwappara Naoki 
 Shoot: Noboru Tonegawa, Michio Hayashi, Shingo Osawa 
 Art: Kitago Hisanori, Yasui Maruotoko 
 Measurement: Shingo Osawa, Masahiro Tanaka, Toshihiro Usuki 
 Assistant directors: Naoki Iwahara, Ryuta Tasaki, Akira Kawada, Kazuya Kitade, Minoru Tabei
 Action Advisor: Masaru Okada (Oono Kenyuukai) 
 Clay Illustration: Kyozo Hayashi 
 Play Illustration: Ryu Noguchi 
 Character coordinator: Satoshi Osano (Ishimori Pro) 
 Video Synthesis: Totsu-ecg system 
 Music: Yusuke Honma 
 Production: Fuji TV, Toei, Yomiko (no credit treatment)

Theme song
 OP song-
 1st ED song-
 performed by Yūko Hanashima.
 2nd ED song-
 performed by Yūko Hanashima.

Legacy
A character based on Poitrine appears in the Kamen Rider franchise film Kamen Rider × Kamen Rider Wizard & Fourze: Movie War Ultimatum. This version is the idealized form of Donut Shop Hungry's effeminate male manager Yu Kamimura (portrayed by Kaba-chan), who appears within a dream world after he is kidnapped by the Akumaizer as part of their plot to build an army of monsters and conquer humanity before Kamimura is rescued by Kamen Riders Wizard and Fourze and their allies.

See also
 Toei Fushigi Comedy Series
 Socialite Belle Panchanne: The Wife Is a Superheroine!

Shotaro Ishinomori
Toei tokusatsu
Tokusatsu television series
1990 Japanese television series debuts
1990 Japanese television series endings
1990s Japanese television series
Fuji TV original programming
Japanese comedy television series
Siblings in fiction